The Texas Humanitarian Service Ribbon is the sixth highest campaign/service award that may be issued to a service member of the Texas Military Forces. There is no provision for subsequent awards.

Eligibility
The Texas Humanitarian Service Ribbon shall be issued to any service member of the Texas Military Forces who:

 Served on active duty orders under Texas command (Title 32)
 Participated satisfactorily in the accomplishment of missions to protect life and/or property during or in the aftermath of natural disasters or civil unrest
 When the event does not meet the criteria for award of the United States Humanitarian Service Medal

Authority

Awarding 
Texas Government Code, Chapter 437 (Texas Military), Subchapter H. (Awards), Section 355 (Other Awards), Line 5.

Legal 
The Texas Humanitarian Service Ribbon was established by Senator Carlos Truan in Senate Bill 643, authorized by the Seventy-sixth Texas Legislature, and approved by Governor George W. Bush on May 24, 1999, effective same date.

Description 
The ribbon is 1-3/8 inches wide and consists of the following stripes: 3/16 inch red; 1/8 inch blue; 1/8 inch white, 11/16 inch blue, 1/8 inch white, 1/8 inch blue and 3/16 inch red.

Notable Recipients

See also 

 Awards and decorations of the Texas Military
 Awards and decorations of the Texas government
 Texas Military Forces
 Texas Military Department
 List of conflicts involving the Texas Military

References

Texas
Texas Military Forces
Texas Military Department